The  is an electric multiple unit (EMU) train type operated in Japan by the private railway operator Hankyu since 1976.

Formations

8-car sets

8-car mixed 6000/7000 series sets

4-car sets

3+3-car sets

3-car sets

2-car sets

Resale
Eight-car set 6002 was transferred to the Nose Electric Railway in 2014.

References

Electric multiple units of Japan
6000 series
Train-related introductions in 1976

Alna Koki rolling stock
1500 V DC multiple units of Japan